Nolana galapagensis , is a species of flowering plant in the Solanaceae (nightshade) family. It is endemic to the Galapagos Islands.

Description
Nolana galapagensis is a small shrub with small fleshy green leaves that are arranged in dense groups along the branches. It has small white flowers.

Range and habitat
Nolana galapagensis is endemic to the Galapagos Islands, where it grows along the coasts of most of the islands.

References

Solanoideae
Garden plants of South America
Endemic flora of Ecuador
Plants described in 1936